Cristian Martínez Medina (born 19 May 1983) is a Paraguayan professional football manager and former player.

Career
Martínez spent his entire footballing career in the Paraguayan Primera División. He played for 3 de Febrero, Sportivo Luqueño, Sportivo Carapeguá, General Díaz, and Deportivo Capiatá. In 2018, he retired from football due to a health problem, and promptly managed the reserves of General Díaz. In April 2019, he was appointed the manager at General Díaz. He had a short stint as the manager San Lorenzo in 2020.

References

External links
 
 

1983 births
Living people
People from Misiones Department
Paraguayan footballers
Paraguayan football managers
Sportivo Luqueño players
Club Sol de América footballers
Association football midfielders
Paraguayan Primera División players
Club General Díaz (Luque) managers